Benzydamine (also known as Tantum Verde and branded in some countries as Maxtra Gargle,  Difflam and Septabene), available as the hydrochloride salt, is a locally acting nonsteroidal anti-inflammatory drug (NSAID) with local anaesthetic and analgesic properties for pain relief and anti-inflammatory treatment of inflammatory conditions of the mouth and throat. It falls under class of chemicals known as indazole.

History
It was synthesized in Italy in 1964 and marketed in 1966.

Uses

Medical
 Odontostomatology: gingivitis, stomatitis, glossitis, aphthous ulcers, dental surgery and oral ulceration due to radiation therapy.
 Otorhinolaryngology: glandular fever, pharyngitis, tonsillitis, post-tonsillectomy, radiation or intubation mucositis.
It may be used alone or as an adjunct to other therapy giving the possibility of increased therapeutic effect with little risk of interaction.

In some markets, the drug is supplied as an over-the-counter cream (Lonol in Mexico from Boehringer Ingelheim) used for topical treatment of musculoskeletal system disorders: sprains, strains, bursitis, tendinitis, synovitis, myalgia, periarthritis.

Recreational
Benzydamine has been used recreationally. In overdosages it acts as a deliriant and CNS stimulant. Such use, particularly among teenagers, has been reported in Brazil, Poland, Romania, and Turkey.

Contraindications
There are no contraindications to the use of benzydamine except for known hypersensitivity.

Side effects
Benzydamine is well tolerated. Occasionally oral tissue numbness or stinging sensations may occur, as well as itching, a skin rash, skin swelling or redness, difficulty breathing and wheezing.

Pharmacology
It selectively binds to inflamed tissues (Prostaglandin synthetase inhibitor) and is normally free of adverse systemic effects.
Unlike other NSAIDs, it does not inhibit cyclooxygenase or lipooxygenase, and is not ulcerogenic. It has powerful reinforcing effect and has cross sensitization with drugs of abuse such as heroin and cocaine in animals. It is hypothesized that it has cannabinoid agonistic activity.

Pharmacokinetic
Benzydamine is poorly absorbed through skin and vagina.

Synthesis

Synthesis starts with the reaction of the N-benzyl derivative from methyl anthranilate with nitrous acid to give the N-nitroso derivative. Reduction by means of sodium thiosulfate leads to the transient hydrazine (3), which undergoes spontaneous internal hydrazide formation. Treatment of the enolate of this amide with 3-chloro-1-dimethylamino propane gives benzydamine (5). Please note there is an error in this section: US3318905 states that the nitroso derivative is reduced with sodium hydrosulfite (sodium dithionite) and not with sodium hyposulfite (sodium thiosulfate), as shown in the above scheme and stated in text. 

An interesting alternative synthesis of this substance starts by sequential reaction of N-benzylaniline with phosgene, and then with sodium azide to product the corresponding carbonyl azide. On heating, nitrogen is evolved and a separatable mixture of nitrene insertion product and the desired ketoindazole # results. The latter reaction appears to be a Curtius rearrangement type product to produce an N-isocyanate #, which then cyclizes. Alkylation of the enol with sodium methoxide and 3-dimethylaminopropyl chloride gives benzydamine.

Alternatively, use of chloroacetamide in the alkylation step followed by acid hydrolysis produces bendazac instead.

Research
Studies indicate that benzydamine has notable in vitro antibacterial activity and also shows synergism in combination with other antibiotics, especially tetracyclines, against antibiotic-resistant strains of Staphylococcus aureus and Pseudomonas aeruginosa.

It also has some cannabinoid activity in rats but has not been tested in humans. It is also hypothesized to act on 5-HT2A receptors due to its structural similarity with serotonin.

See also 
 AB-FUBINACA
 Pravadoline
 GW-405,833
 Bendazac

References

External links 
 
 
 

Nonsteroidal anti-inflammatory drugs
Indazoles
Dimethylamino compounds
Dental drugs
Benzyl compounds
Muscarinic antagonists
Aromatic ethers